is a Japanese model and actress who is represented by the agencies Incent and Idea. She graduated from Sagami Women's University High School. She is the eldest of three siblings (with a younger brother and sister).

Biography
Takagaki debuted as an exclusive model in Petit Seven in 1995. Then she was an exclusive model for JJ and appeared in fashion magazines, such as More, Style, Classy, Ef, and Luci.

In 2006, Takagaki starred in the net movie 10minute Diary directed by Eriko Kitagawa.

From February 2008, she became an exclusive model for AneCan.

Takagaki married speed skating player Hiroyasu Shimizu on March 31, 2010, but they divorced on December 19, 2011. She married music producer Masanori Morita on March 27, 2015.

Filmography

TV series

Magazines

References

External links
Official Incent profile 
AneCan profile  
Official blog 

Japanese female models
Japanese actresses
1979 births
Living people
People from Tokyo
Models from Tokyo Metropolis